West Derbyshire may refer to:

West Derby Hundred, one of the six subdivisions of Lancashire, England, in the 11th century.
West Derbyshire (UK Parliament constituency), in the west of Derbyshire, unrelated to the above.
The former name of the Derbyshire Dales district, covering roughly the same area as the constituency.